Eric Karel Paul Van Rompuy (born 23 November 1949 in Uccle) is a Flemish politician.

Biography
He is the son of the later Prof. em. dr. Vic Van Rompuy and brother of Herman Van Rompuy and Christine Van Rompuy.

After obtaining his licentiate degree in economics, he obtained a baccalaureate degree in philosophy (1971). In 1975, he obtained a PhD in economics at the KU Leuven.

From 1976 till 1981, he worked at the Kredietbank as economist. In the meantime, he was elected in 1977 as national president of the Christian People's Party (CVP) youth wing (now CD&V). He remained president until 1983. In 1981, he had already become Member of Parliament of the European Parliament.

In 1981, he became a member of the local city council of Zaventem (1 January 1983 - 31 December 1988). In 1988, the CVP lost the elections.

His national career started when he was elected as Member of Parliament in 1985. He would remain in that function until 1995. From 1991 until 1995, he was MP in the Flemish parliament.

In 1995, he became the first Flemish minister of Economy, Agriculture and Media. In 1999, he resigned after the huge electoral loss of his party.

Since 1999, he has been MP in the Flemish Parliament.

He is married to Viviane Geuffens.

References 

 

1949 births
Living people
People from Uccle
Flemish politicians
Members of the Flemish Parliament
Christian Democratic and Flemish politicians
KU Leuven alumni
Belgian Roman Catholics
21st-century Belgian politicians